De natura rerum may refer to:
 De rerum natura, a didactic poem by Lucretius
 De natura rerum (Bede), a treatise by Bede
 De natura rerum, a treatise by Isidore of Seville
 De natura rerum (Cantimpré), a natural history by Thomas of Cantimpré